The 2009 MSBL season was the 21st season of the Men's State Basketball League (SBL). The regular season began on Friday 13 March and ended on Saturday 18 July. The finals began on Saturday 25 July and ended on Saturday 22 August, when the Lakeside Lightning defeated the Perry Lakes Hawks in the MSBL Grand Final.

Regular season
The regular season began on Friday 13 March and ended on Saturday 18 July after 19 rounds of competition.

Standings

Finals
The finals began on Saturday 25 July and ended on Saturday 22 August with the MSBL Grand Final.

Bracket

Awards

Player of the Week

Statistics leaders

Regular season
 Most Valuable Player: Luke Meyer (Geraldton Buccaneers)
 Coach of the Year: Andy Stewart (Lakeside Lightning)
 Most Improved Player: Ben Purser (Perry Lakes Hawks)
 All-Star Five:
 PG: Shamus Ballantyne (Goldfields Giants)
 SG: Luke Payne (Lakeside Lightning)
 SF: Luke Meyer (Geraldton Buccaneers)
 PF: Adrian Majstrovich (Kalamunda Eastern Suns)
 C: Jarrad Prue (Lakeside Lightning)

Finals
 Grand Final MVP: Luke Payne (Lakeside Lightning)

References

External links
 March Player & Coach of the Month
 April Player & Coach of the Month
 May Player & Coach of the Month
 June Player & Coach of the Month
 July Player & Coach of the Month

2009
2008–09 in Australian basketball
2009–10 in Australian basketball